Alan Thomas (born 1964) is a British philosopher in the Department of Philosophy at the University of York. He is best known for his works on ethics and political philosophy.

Career
Thomas was educated at the Graig Comprehensive School, Llanelli, before undergraduate study at King's College, Cambridge. Following a year at Harvard University as a Kennedy Scholar, Thomas returned to Oxford University to complete his doctorate under the supervision of Bernard Williams. Thomas began his career at King's College, London before taking up a lectureship at the University of Kent at Canterbury. Thomas became a professor of ethics at Tilburg University in 2010 before becoming a professor of philosophy at the University of York in 2016. He has been a visiting scholar at the University of British Columbia (2007–2008), a fellow of the Murphy Institute at Tulane University (2009–10), a visiting fellow of the Humanities Research Centre at the Australian National University (2015) and a visiting professor at St. Louis University (2015). His research has been funded by the AHRC (2001) and the Templeton Foundation (2015, 2016–18). In 2019 Thomas was funded by the UK's Independent Social Research Foundation for work on the regulation of the financial sector. He is currently part of a multi-department (Philosophy, Computing, Law) and multi-university research team working on the UKRI (EPSRC) funded project on the resilience of autonomous systems.

Books
 Republic of Equals: Predistribution and Property-Owning Democracy, Oxford University Press, 2017
 Thomas Nagel, Routledge, 2015
 Bernard Williams (editor and contributor), Cambridge University Press, 2007
 Value and Context: the Nature of Moral and Political Knowledge, The Clarendon Press, 2010

References

External links
 Alan Thomas's Blog

21st-century British philosophers
Philosophy academics
Living people
1964 births
Alumni of the University of Oxford
Academics of the University of York
Academics of King's College London
Academics of the University of Kent
Academic staff of Tilburg University
Political philosophers